Kjell Anders Nordström (born 26 February 1958) is a Swedish economist, writer and public speaker.

Biography  
Born in Skärholmen, a suburban district in southern Stockholm, Nordström grew up on a small island in the Finnish Åland archipelago. His parents returned to Sweden in the 1960s. He was first educated as an engineer and thereafter commenced studies at the Stockholm School of Economics where he earned a Ph.D. in 1991.

Until 2004 he was an assistant professor at the Institute of International Business (IIB) at the Stockholm School of Economics. His research and consulting focus is in the areas of strategic management, multinational corporations and globalization. He has served as an advisor/consultant to several large multinationals and to the government of the United Kingdom.

Today, Nordström and Ridderstråle work as professional public speakers in the field of strategic management. The 2005 Thinkers 50, the bi-annual global ranking of management thinkers, ranked Nordström and Ridderstråle at number nine internationally and number one in Europe.

Work 
In 2000 the book Funky Business - Talent Makes Capital Dance, which was written by Kjell A. Nordström and his colleague Jonas Ridderstråle, was published. The book, which is described as a "manifesto of what our time requires from business firms and their leaders", became an international best-seller and has to date been translated into 33 languages. In 2000, both Amazon.co.uk and the webzine Management General rated it as one of the five best business books of the year. Another survey ranked it as the 16th best business book of all time.

In 2003, the follow-up Karaoke Capitalism - Management for Mankind, also written together with Jonas Ridderstråle, was published. The book, which also became an international success, has to date been contracted for publication in 23 languages. In March 2004, Nordström and Ridderstråle appeared on CNN's program Global Office for an extensive interview on the ideas behind Karaoke Capitalism.

Publications 
 
 
 
 
 
 
 Vahlne, Jan-Erik, and Kjell A. Nordström (1992). Is the globe shrinking: Psychic distance and the establishment of Swedish sales subsidiaries during the last 100 years.

References

External links 

 Interview with Dr. Kjell A. Nordström, Manner of Man Magazine 

1958 births
Living people
Swedish business theorists
Swedish economists
Swedish male writers
Business speakers
Academic staff of the Stockholm School of Economics
Writers from Stockholm
Stockholm School of Economics alumni
Members of the Riksdag 2002–2006